Rinzia fimbriolata, commonly known as the Wheatbelt rinzia, is a plant species of the family Myrtaceae endemic to Western Australia.

The shrub is found in a small area of the eastern Wheatbelt  region of Western Australia near Yilgarn.

References

fimbriolata
Endemic flora of Western Australia
Myrtales of Australia
Rosids of Western Australia
Endangered flora of Australia
Plants described in 2017
Taxa named by Barbara Lynette Rye